Volume 2 is a compilation album by American rock band CKY. It was released by Distant Recordings and Teil Martin International on February 27, 1999, the same day as the band's debut studio album Volume 1. The album features a number of early demo recordings, as well as skits and samples from the first CKY video, and recordings of prank calls performed by Brandon DiCamillo.

Often considered a soundtrack album for the first CKY video, Volume 2 was produced early in CKY's career, largely during sessions for Volume 1 and earlier demos. In contrast to other releases by the band, the album features a number of comedic tracks included in the CKY video, as well as various skits and other rough recordings. Multiple songs have been subsequently released in other forms.

Background
Recording for Volume 2 took place between 1996 and 1998 in various locations: tracks were recorded by guitarist Chad Ginsburg on a 24-track tape and an ADAT in Newtown, Pennsylvania, drummer Jess Margera on a four-track tape in West Chester, Pennsylvania, John Teague on an ADAT in Westtown, Pennsylvania, and Dave Kurtz on an eight-track tape in Downingtown, Pennsylvania. Brandon DiCamillo's prank calls were recorded by DiCamillo and Margera in West Chester.

The songs on Volume 2 largely include rough demos of subsequently released songs, early recordings of songs later released by Foreign Objects (a band featuring CKY members Deron Miller and Margera), and alternate mixes and recordings of Volume 1 tracks. Volume 2 is the original album on which the song "Shippensburg" was released. Originally recorded in 1997 for Volume 1, but later removed as it "didn't fit well with the album", "Shippensburg" became one of the most popular songs among CKY fans, as noted by Jess Margera when revealing the news of 2011 compilation B-Sides & Rarities, on which the song also features.

Due to the majority of the album's contents featuring on the first CKY video, it is often considered as a soundtrack album for the film, and was described as such on the band's website. The video's two main stars, DiCamillo and Bam Margera, are featured on a number of songs including "Step to CKY", "Santa's Coming" and "Drunken Freestyle".

Release
Volume 2 was originally released on February 27, 1999, in a limited run of 1,200 copies. It was later released on April 1, 2001, limited to 5,000 copies, and was finally released in unlimited runs starting July 1, 2002. In between the first and second pressings of the album, a limited edition of 100 copies was reportedly produced and distributed by drummer Jess Margera with a different track listing. A 5,000 copy-run of the album was released on picture disc on July 5, 2003.

Due to both the rough nature of many of the tracks on Volume 2, as well as the rarity of the album itself, a number of songs have been included on later releases: "Genesis 12a", "Santa's Coming", "Shippensburg", the "Rio Bravo" remix, "Foreign Objects #10" and the "Disengage the Simulator" demo were included on the 2000 extended play (EP) Disengage the Simulator. "Genesis 12a", "Testing", "Foreign Objects #10" and "Planetary" were later released on the 2004 Foreign Objects album Universal Culture Shock, under the titles of "Genesis 12/A", "Test It Out", "Universal Culture Shock" and "Planetary", respectively; and "Shippensburg" was also released on the compilation album B-Sides & Rarities in 2011.

According to Miller, as of August 2015 the album has sold over 6,500 copies, making it the second-lowest-selling CKY album ahead of B-Sides & Rarities.

Track listing
Original release

1999 reissue

2001 – 2-CD reissue

2002 – 2-CD reissue

2003 – vinyl reissue

Personnel

Deron Miller – guitar, bass, vocals ("Shippensbam", "Fairman's Song" and "Sucky Christmas")
Chad I Ginsburg – guitar, vocals ("Chad's in Hi-Fi"), programming ("Fat Fuck")
Jess Margera – drums
Bam Margera – vocals ("Foolin'", "Bon Jovi", "Shippensbam", "Kerry Getz", "Step to CKY", "My Music Bam Bam" and "Santa's Coming"), bass ("Drunken Freestyle"), photography (reissues)
Brandon DiCamillo – vocals ("Eye of the Tiger" and "Drunken Freestyle"), prank calls
Ryan Gee – photography
Rob Erickson – design and layout (original edition)
Rake Yohn – design and layout (reissues)
Adam Wallacavage – photography (reissues)

References

External links

CKY (band) albums
1999 albums
Sequel albums